Carlo Rampini (25 October 1891 – 28 March 1968) was an Italian footballer who played as a midfielder. He represented the Italy national football team eight times, the first being on 6 January 1911, on the occasion of a friendly match against the Hungary in a 1–0 home loss. He was also part of Italy's squad for the football tournament at the 1912 Summer Olympics, but he did not play in any matches.

His brother Alessandro Rampini was also a footballer for Pro Vercelli.

Honours

Player
Pro Vercelli
Italian Football Championship: 1908, 1909, 1910–11, 1911–12, 1912–13

References

1891 births
1968 deaths
Italian footballers
Italy international footballers
Association football midfielders
F.C. Pro Vercelli 1892 players